Willi Hutter (3 November 1896 – 27 June 1936) was a German international footballer.

References

1896 births
1936 deaths
Association football forwards
German footballers
Germany international footballers
SV Waldhof Mannheim players
SV Saar 05 Saarbrücken players